Slavoljub Nikolić (Serbian Cyrillic: Славољуб Николић; born 31 January 1960) is a Serbian former professional footballer who played as a midfielder.

References

External links
 
 

Lyon La Duchère players
AS Nancy Lorraine players
Association football midfielders
En Avant Guingamp players
Expatriate footballers in France
FK Radnički Niš players
Ligue 2 players
Serbian footballers
Sportspeople from Niš
Stade Malherbe Caen players
Yugoslav expatriate footballers
Yugoslav expatriates in France
Yugoslav First League players
Yugoslav footballers
Yugoslavia international footballers
1960 births
Living people